Precious Cornerstone University  is a Nigerian Private University founded in 2017 and located in Ibadan, Oyo State in Nigeria. The institution is established by the sword of the Spirit Ministries, a popular Pentecostal church in Ibadan, Oyo State, a church presided by Francis Wale Oke who also happens to be the Chancellor of Precious Cornerstone University.

Academic Division 
The institution of higher learning established in 2017 currently houses two faculties. The faculties are:

 Faculty of Pure and Applied Sciences
 Faculty of Social And Management Sciences

Vice Chancellor 
The vice-chancellor of Precious Cornerstone University is Professor Julius Kola Oloke, who also doubles as the pioneer vice-chancellor of the higher institution of learning. The vice-chancellor in 2021 inaugurated the pioneer student union leaders for the institution while also enjoining them to be of good conduct within and outside the institution of learning.

Achievement 
Following the establishment of Precious Cornerstone University in 2017, the institution had its pioneer matriculation ceremony in 2019 and the school matriculated 78 pioneer students into the institution on the set date. In the 2020–2021 academic session, the institution also  some of the bodies are the Robotics and Artificial Intelligence in Nigeria, the Oyo state government, the University of Lincoln on Higher Education in Nigeria amongst others.

References 

Universities and colleges in Nigeria
Christian universities and colleges in Nigeria
Educational institutions established in 2017